Elihu, founded in 1903, is the fourth oldest senior society at Yale University, New Haven, CT. While similar to Skull and Bones, Scroll and Key and Wolf's Head societies in charter and function, Elihu favors privacy over secrecy. It was founded as "the first non-secret senior society". The society's building, located at 175 Elm Street, has windows, though they are blinded. Like the other societies, the organization's building is typically closed to non-members. It takes its name from Elihu Yale.

Selection and program 
During the Spring Tap process, sixteen rising seniors are elected into membership of Elihu. Selection is performed behind closed doors, in keeping with the other major societies. Consideration for membership in Elihu is given to those juniors in the College who are nominated by current undergraduate and graduate members, and selection is based on three pillars: excellence, diversity, and leadership.

The Elihu program is similar to that of the other landed senior secret societies: personal histories/biographies and perspectives are shared among the current delegates, with formal meetings each Thursday and Sunday of the academic year. Other components of the academic program includes topical essays on pertinent issues, personal bonding time and group reflection activities. The sharing of personal stories became a plot device in a movie directed by Elihu member Alan Hruska (class of 1955), who jettisoned a career as a trial lawyer to become a film director. Hruska's 2009 film Reunion explored a mythical reunion of fellow society members some 23 years after graduation, and was loosely inspired by a gathering of Hruska's own Elihu delegation.

Tap histories 
From its earliest days, the society has favored those who leaned toward literary pursuits, acting, teaching, and the law. Elihu Society's taps among the Yale class of 1914, for instance, included Rufus King, president of the Yale Dramatic Association, and Newbold Noyes, Sr., chairman of the Yale Literary Magazine and later publisher of the Washington Evening Star newspaper.

In a March 2000 essay on Yale's societies in Salon.com, Jacques Leslie, a Jew from a Democratic family in California, recalled learning he would be tapped for Skull and Bones. "I was leaning towards Elihu," wrote Leslie, who later became a journalist and author, "the sole above-ground society that was headquartered in an actual frame house with windows." When the Bonesmen arrived to tap Leslie, he shouted "Reject!" The surprised expression on the Bonesman's face was printed on the following day's second front page of The New York Times. "Skull was first," noted The Times in its caption, "but he chose Elihu."

Connecticut Senator Joseph Lieberman was also courted by Skull and Bones, despite the fact that he wrote editorials critical of the society in the Yale Daily News. "Heresy of all heresies," Lieberman wrote in The News, "it would be wonderful if, as a symbolic gesture, the societies some day put windows in their buildings. No other institution seems to separate the haves from the have-nots so forcefully in the eyes of students." But Skull and Bones chose to ignore Lieberman's complaints and tapped him anyway. Lieberman rejected Bones in favor of Elihu. "It was too old Yalie," Lieberman told a friend about Bones. "Instead," noted the Los Angeles Times, Lieberman "joined the Elihu Society, a more intellectual club."

The political journalist Jacob Weisberg, formerly editor of Slate, was similarly offered membership in Skull and Bones by Senator John Kerry. Weisberg declined, citing Bones' exclusion of women. Shortly afterwards Weisberg was persuaded by The Washington Post'''s Robert G. Kaiser to join Elihu instead.

Elihu tapped as a member for the delegation of 1932, in the depth of The Great Depression, a small-town Tennessee boy strapped for cash who was grateful for the $1,000 he received as senior aide of Pierson College as it covered half the year's outlay for college. The student, John Templeton, went on to a career as pioneer of international investing, founder of one of the nation's largest mutual fund companies, and patron of a philanthropic enterprise, now run by his son, also an Elihu member. Templeton was knighted by the Queen.

While Sir John Templeton used his fortune to endow a foundation devoted to Christian thought, other Elihu members had a different take on their Elihu experience. Paul Monette, an author and gay rights activist, who portrayed himself to fellow delegation members as a depressive rather than actively gay, became, following his graduation, a prominent author and spokesman for the gay community.

Elihu membership has included journalists, authors, academics, independent and documentary filmmakers, U.S. Ambassadors, government officials, urban planners, artists, members of Congress, social activists, governors, actors, a Chairman of U.S. Federal Reserve, pop singers, medical doctors, architects, United Nations officials, environmental lawyers, United States Senators, composers, including David Shire and Maury Yeston, businessmen, foundation executives, environmentalists and others.Edward Lyman Munson, M.D., Calisphere, University of California, cdlib.orgYale Daily News, 4 February 2003 David Shire, Buffalo Music Hall of fame, buffalomusic.org 

 Architecture 

The organization is housed in a structure acquired by the Society in 1911 which looks out on the New Haven Green. The three-story colonial-era white clapboard house is, in fact, the oldest of all Yale's secret society buildings, and purportedly one of the oldest original structures in the United States still in regular use. Its brick basement is older still, constructed in the early 17th century, and later frequented by colonists sympathetic to the English cause when it became known as the Tory Tavern, a central locale of the Revolutionary War. Following the War, the town of New Haven confiscated the building from its Loyalist owner for his activities.

The building has also been expanded to the rear several times. During the demonstrations and student strikes associated with the New Haven Black Panther trials and other civil unrest in 1970, numbers of the twelve thousand protesters at times found refuge inside the Elihu building.

The building is among the largest of the societies, belying the modest clapboard facade, and contains two single guest rooms in addition to beds for all the current undergraduate members, as well as a large formal meeting room, a library, formal dining room, and an informal 'tap room' in the basement. The club also has a section of the old Yale Fence in its basement, a relic from the famous structure removed in 1888.

Another tradition on campus is that Elihu contains original papers of the author James Fenimore Cooper, even drafts of his epic novel The Last of the Mohicans'', in its collection. Author Cooper wasn't a member of Elihu as he was expelled from Yale in 1805, a century before the society was founded. However, his great-grandson James Fenimore Cooper, Jr. (1892–1918) was a member of the 1913 delegation.

Elihu Yale Lecture 
The society sponsors the Elihu Yale Lecture, the first of which was delivered in 2002 by architect and city planner Alexander Garvin, an Elihu member. The 2005 lecture was delivered by actor Sam Waterston, also an Elihu member.

See also
Collegiate secret societies in North America

Notes

External links
Elihu Club house, Yale University Manuscripts & Archives
Secret Societies: Tombs and Tradition, Yale Daily News, 30 June 2002
How the Secret Societies Got That Way, Yale Alumni Magazine
Elihu Senior Society website

1903 establishments in the United States
Federal architecture in Connecticut
Secret societies at Yale
Student organizations established in 1903